Arius acutirostris is a species of catfish in the family Ariidae. It is a fresh- and brackish-water species that inhabits lower reaches of tidal rivers and estuaries. It is known from the Irrawaddy and Salween River basins in Myanmar and from the Kraburi River estuary in Thailand.

A. acutirostris can be locally common and is caught in local fisheries.

References

acutirostris
Fish of Myanmar
Fish of Thailand
Taxa named by Francis Day
Fish described in 1877